Dangon is a village in the Raikot tehsil of Ludhiana district in Punjab State, India. Dango is a variation of the same name.

Notable personalities
 Indian movie superstar Dharmendra's ancestral origins lie in the village.
 A folk character of this village, Munshi Dango da, is an integral part of Punjabi folklore.

In popular culture
Shooting for the Aamir Khan starrer movie Dangal took place in Dangon in September 2015 and also in Gujjarwal, Narangwal, Kila Raipur, and Leel in Punjab.

References 

Villages in Ludhiana district